Gongivaripalli is a village  (with a gram panchayat) located at a distance of around 3 kilometers from Sodam, Chittoor District, Andhra Pradesh. The village comes under Punganur constituency.  The village is known to have a renowned international school The Peepal Grove School. Honorable ex-president of India, Dr.A.P.J.Abdul Kalam participated in the inauguration of this school.

Image gallery

References 

Villages in Chittoor district